The 1990 Embassy World Indoor Bowls Championship  was held at Preston Guild Hall, Preston, England, from 20 February - 4 March 1990.

In the singles John Price won the title beating Ian Schuback in the final. In the pairs David Bryant and Tony Allcock secured their fourth world title.

The second Women's Indoor World Championship sponsored by Volkswagen took place at the Guernsey Bowling Club from April 21–22 and was won by Fleur Bougourd.

Winners

Draw and results

Men's singles

Men's Pairs

Women's singles

References

External links 
 

World Indoor Bowls Championship
1990 in bowls